Euomphalidae is an extinct family of Paleozoic to early Mesozoic marine molluscs which may be gastropods with anisostrophically coiled shells (according to the taxonomy of the Gastropoda by Bouchet & Rocroi, 2005).
The shells show a selenizone.

Genera 
Genera in the family Euomphalidae include:

 Acanthonema
 Alaionema
 Amphiscapha
 Anisostoma
 Araeonema - synonym: Palaeoturbina
 Austerum
 Bicarina
 Biformispira
 Centrifugus - synonym: Hisingeria
 Coelodiscus C.-C.Jao, 1941 (unaccepted)
 Cylicioscapha
 Discotropis
 Eleutherospira
 Elkoceras
 Euomphalopsis
 Euomphalus J. de C. Sowerby, 1814 - type genus - synonyms: Phymatifer, Schizostoma, Paromphalus.
 Fletcherviewia
 Goldfussoceras
 Hippocampoides
 Kiaeromphalus
 Leptomphalus
 Linsleyella
 Nevadaspira
 Nodeuomphalus
 Novakopteron
 Nummocalcar
 Odontomaria
 Offleyotrochus
 Phanerotinus
 Planotectus
 Platybasis
 Pleuronotus
 Poleumita - synonyms: Polytropina, Polytropis.
 Rhabdotocochlis
 Saturnotropis
 Sinistrispira
 Sinutropis
 Spinicharybdiinae
 Straparollus
 Stusakia
 Tychobrahea
 Weeksia
 Woehrmannia

References 

 Bouchet P., Rocroi J.P., Hausdorf B., Kaim A., Kano Y., Nützel A., Parkhaev P., Schrödl M. & Strong E.E. (2017). Revised classification, nomenclator and typification of gastropod and monoplacophoran families. Malacologia. 61(1-2): 1–526.

External links
 Linsley R.M. & Yochelson E.L. 1973. Devonian Carrier Shells (Euomphalidae) from North America and Germany. Geological Survey Professional Paper, 824: 1-26, pl. 1-6.

External links